The Michaels may be 
Michael Leshner and Michael Stark, the men who in 2003 entered into the first legal same-sex marriage in Canada.
Michael Kovrig and Michael Spavor, Canadians formerly detained in China.
The Michaels Companies